Polina Sergeevna Shmatko (born March 26, 2003 in Moscow, Russia) is a Russian individual rhythmic gymnast. She is the 2016 European Junior Clubs, Ball champion and the 2018 European Junior Hoop champion. At national level she is the 2016 Russian Junior all-around silver medalist. She is 2018 European championships gold medalist in team event and in hoop finals. She retired because of health problems. Her father is the politician and entrepreneur Sergei Shmatko, who died on November 7, 2021 as a result of covid-19 disease.

Career

Junior 
Shmatko first came to notice in the novice girls division at Miss Valentine 2012 in Tartu, Estonia. Shmatko later competed at the prestigious Russian rhythmic gymnastics competition at the 2015 Hope of Russia, winning the all-around gold.

In the 2016 season, Shmatko debuted in her first Junior Grand Prix at the Alina Cup, where she won gold for Team Russia with Alina Ermolova. She qualified for one apparatus final, where she won gold in ball. Shmatko competed at the Lisboa Junior World Cup where she won team gold (with Daria Pridannikova), she qualified to all event finals: winning gold in ball, silver in hoop, placed 6th in clubs and 8th in rope. She then won the all-around silver at the 2016 Russian Junior Championships behind Ermolova. She competed at the 2016 Junior Grand Prix Brno where Team Russia won silver, and qualified in two apparatus, winning silver in ball and bronze in clubs. At the Junior World Cup in Sofia, Shmatko won team gold but finished 6th in the ball final after dropping her ball twice. She was selected to compete at the 2016 European Junior Championships where she again won team gold (with Alina Ermolova and Maria Sergeeva). Shmatko also qualified for two apparatus finals, where she won gold in ball (17.100) and clubs (17.200), setting a junior record score under the 20-point CoP judging system.

In the 2017, Shmatko started the season at the Junior Grand Prix Moscow where she finished 4th in the all-around. Her next event was at the International Tournament of Lisbon where she won bronze in the all-around. At the Junior Grand Prix Marbella, Shmatko finished 4th in the all-around and won gold in Team (together with Lala Kramarenko). Shmatko competed at the Happy Caravan Cup in Tashkent where she won gold in team event, she qualified 2 apparatus finals taking the gold medal in clubs and silver in ball. On May 5–7, Shmatko competed at the  Sofia Junior World Cup where she won silver in the all-around behind teammate Lala Kramarenko. In October 12–14, Shmatko won bronze in the all-around at the "2017 Hope of Russia".

In the 2018 season, Shmatko suffered a toe injury and withdrew from the nominative list for the Junior Grand Prix Moscow. She returned into competition on April 4–6 at the MTM Ljubljana tournament, she took bronze in the all-around and won silver in hoop and ball finals. On May 4–6, at the 2018 Junior World Cup Guadalajara, she won gold in team, hoop and bronze with clubs. Her next event was at the Junior Grand Prix Holon where she won 3 gold medals in team, hoop and clubs. Shmatko was selected to compete at the 2018 European Junior Championships held in Guadalajara, Spain, she won team gold (together with Lala Kramarenko, Daria Trubnikova and Anastasia Sergeeva), she also qualified into the hoop and won the final with a new personal best score in hoop of 18.825. Later on Shmatko confirmed that she is no longer doing gymnastics for at least 6 months. She is currently battling with health issues and with back injury. Now she is retired.

Routine music information

Competitive Highlights

References

External links
 
 Polina Shmatko at Gimnastika.pro 
 

2003 births
Living people
Russian rhythmic gymnasts
Gymnasts from Moscow